The National Development and Reform Commission (NDRC) is a macroeconomic management agency under the State Council, which has broad administrative and planning control over the economy of Mainland China. It has reputation of being the "mini-state council".

The candidate for the chairperson of the NDRC is nominated by the Premier of the People's Republic of China and approved by the National People's Congress. Since March 2023 the commission has been headed by Zheng Shanjie.

Synopsis

The body was first established in November 1952 as the State Planning Commission of the Central People's Government. In 1954, it was transformed to the State Planning Commission of the People's Republic of China.

In March 1998, the commission was renamed into the State Development Planning Commission. It was renamed again in March 2003 to its current name, the National Development and Reform Commission.

The NDRC's functions are to study and formulate policies for economic and social development, maintain the balance of economic development, and to guide restructuring of the economic system of Mainland China. The NDRC has twenty-six functional departments/bureaus/offices with an authorized staff size of 890 civil servants. Prior to 2018, it was also responsible for enforcing China's antitrust law, but this function has been transferred to the State Administration for Market Regulation.

The NDRC is one of the main government agencies responsible for data collection for the Chinese Social Credit System.

On 19 December 2020, the NDRC published rules for reviewing foreign investment on national security grounds. The rules allow government agencies "to preview, deny and punish foreign investment activities in areas that are deemed as important to national security." In October 2021, the NDRC published rules restricting private capital in "news-gathering, editing, broadcasting, and distribution."

List of Ministers in charge of the Commission

Current leadership 
 Minister in charge of the National Development and Reform Commission
 Zheng Shanjie

 Vice-ministers
 Mu Hong - Minister level, Deputy General Office chief of the Central Leading Group for Comprehensively Deepening Reforms
 Zhang Yong - Minister level
 Ning Jizhe - Minister level
 Lian Weiliang
 Lin Nianxiu
 Hu Zucai
 Luo Wen

Subordinates 
 Sub-ministry-level national administrations administed by the NDRC
 National Food and Strategic Reserves Administration

See also 
 China Compulsory Certificate
 Economy of China
 Energy in China (category)
 Gosplan
 Number 10 Policy Unit
 State Information Center

References

External links 
 Official site

 
Government agencies of China
Economic development in China
Energy in China
Investment promotion agencies
State Council of the People's Republic of China
2003 establishments in China
Government agencies established in 2003
Organizations based in Beijing
International trade
Foreign relations of China
Economy of China